HMS Proserpine was a 28-gun Enterprise-class sixth-rate frigate of the Royal Navy. She was launched in 1777 was wrecked in February 1799.

Career
Proserpine was first commissioned in July 1777 under the command of Captain Evelyn Sutton.

On 20 October 1779, Proserpine captured the French 26-gun frigate Alcmène, off Martinique. Alcmène had been severely damaged by a storm, and had thrown most of her guns overboard to stay afloat.

On 29 November 1779 Proserpine recaptured  (or Sphynx). She had been in French hands for three to four months.

The only incident appears to have occurred in early July. As Amity Hall was rejoining the fleet on 6 July she collided with the merchant ship . Albions crew abandoned her and Amity Hall took them on board. The accident gave rise to a tort court case that Amity Halls owners lost to Albions owners on the grounds that Amity Halls master had not followed the sailing instructions that Captain Alms of Proserpine had issued on setting out.

On 16 March 1794  captured the French brick-aviso, Goéland, off Jérémie. Proserpine shared in the prize money, suggesting that she was in company with, or in sight of, Penelope.  The Royal Navy briefly took Goéland into service as HMS Goelan.

On 26 March 1798 Proserpine, Captain James Wallis, captured the Danish merchant ship Neptunus.

Proserpine was part of Admiral Duncan's squadron and so shared in the proceeds of the capture of Hoop (6 June 1798), Neptune (12 June), Stadt Embden (14 June), Rose and Endraft (14 June), Hoop (15 June), and Vrow Dorothea (16 June).

FateProserpine was wrecked off the mouth of the Elbe on 1 February 1799.  She was under the command of Captain James Wallis, and was taking the Honourable Thomas Grenville and his party to Cuxhaven, from where they were to proceed on a diplomatic mission to meet Frederick William III of Prussia in Berlin during the War of the Second Coalition.  By 4pm on 31 January the weather had worsened to such a degree that Proserpine had to anchor, four miles short of Cuxhaven.  The weather worsened, and by next morning the channels were blocked by ice.  Wallis got under-weigh to attempt to withdraw and reach a Danish port, but around 9:30pm she grounded.  Attempts to lighten her failed.  The next morning it became clear that she was aground on the Scharhörn Sand near Newark Island in the Elbe, and completely blocked in by ice, which was increasing.

At 1:30, all 187 persons on Proserpine left her and started the six-mile walk to shore, in freezing weather and falling snow. Seven seamen, a boy, four Royal Marines, and one woman and her child died; the rest made it safely to Neuwerk where they took shelter in the tower there. The diplomatic party reached Cuxhaven a few days later.

The ship's master, Mr. Anthony, took five men and returned to Proserpine on 10 February. They found her crushed. While they were still on board, the ship (still encased in ice), was swept out to sea, before she grounded again on Baltrum Island.  Anthony and his companions survived this second shipwreck too.Proserpine Frigate – Official Account of the Loss of that Ship; a letter addressed by Captain Wallis to Vice Admiral Dickson; Feb 18, 1799; "The Naval Chronicle"; January–June 1799; (Bunney & Gold, London); pp. 332–335.

Citations

References
 Demerliac, Alain (1996) La Marine De Louis XVI: Nomenclature Des Navires Français De 1774 À 1792. (Nice: Éditions OMEGA). 
Fletcher, Charles, M.D., (1805) The naval guardian.
 Gardiner, Robert (1992) The First Frigates.(London: Conway Maritime Press). .

 Lyon, David (1993) The Sailing Navy List. (London: Conway Maritime Press)..
  (1671-1870)
 Winfield, Rif (2007) British Warships in the Age of Sail, 1714 to 1792''. (London:Seaforth Publishing). .

1777 ships
Ships built in England
Sixth-rate frigates of the Royal Navy
Maritime incidents in 1799
Shipwrecks of Germany
Shipwrecks in the North Sea
Wadden Sea